Celebrity Detox: The Fame Game is the second memoir written by comedian, actress, and talk show host Rosie O'Donnell. Focusing on her departure from The Rosie O'Donnell Show and later The View, O'Donnell expresses the struggles associated with the almost drug-like concept of fame. The book especially touches on the rift between O'Donnell and Barbara Walters that occurred after O'Donnell publicly berated Donald Trump on the air. Due to editing changes, the book was released in October though it was originally scheduled to be released on September 18. The book debuted at #5 on the New York Times bestselling non-fiction list.

"Sometimes funny, sometimes heartbreaking, and always brutally honest, this is Rosie O'Donnell's surprising account of the pain, regret, and euphoria involved in withdrawing from celebrity life--and the terrifying dangers of relapsing into the spotlight." --Amazon.com

It follows O'Donnell's first memoir, Find Me, published in 2002.

All of Rosie's profits will go to Rosie's Broadway Kids.

References 

2007 non-fiction books
Show business memoirs
Rosie O'Donnell